"Tell Me" is a song by South Korean girl group Wonder Girls, from their debut album, The Wonder Years (2007). It was released as the third and lead single from the album on September 13, 2007, through JYP Entertainment. Written and produced by Park Jin-young, the song samples Stacey Q's "Two of Hearts" (1986) written by John Mitchell. "Tell Me (Rap version)", featuring Yubin's self-written rap verse, was added as a B-side to their second maxi single "So Hot", released in May 2008. 

"Tell Me" was a major commercial success in South Korea, topping various online and offline charts, and was named one of the ten best digital songs in K-pop history by Star News in 2014. It spent six non-consecutive weeks in the number one position on KBS' music chart show Music Bank, and achieved a triple crown at SBS' Inkigayo. The song also gained attention for its choreography, which has been widely imitated and featured on various online video sites.

Background and release
When producer Park Jin-young first introduced the song to the group, the Wonder Girls felt that the song was too different and would not be successful.  However, once they were used to the song, they eventually believed it could be a strong single. JYP Entertainment stated in June 2009 that "Tell Me" would be the second English single for the group, as a follow-up to "Nobody". On May 15, 2010, they released their second American single "2 Different Tears" (also known as 2DT), which includes "Tell Me" on the track list.

"Tell Me" is a fast-tempo song about a girl who has fallen in love who hopes that he likes her too which she asks him to tell her that he likes her too.  The highlight of the song is an exclamation of surprise, "어머나!" (Eomeona!, similar in meaning to "Oh, my goodness!) during the chorus which member Sohee does her trademark “Omona” expression.

Versions
The original version of "Tell Me" is featured on the group's debut album The Wonder Years and features vocals from the original line-up consisting of Min Sunye, Park Yeeun, Ann Sohee, Lee Sun Mi and Kim Hyuna. After the departure of Kim Hyuna, the song received a rap verse to see the introduction of Kim Yubin to the public. The radio version was unavailable for purchase upon the single's original release. The song was later made available for purchase on the group's single "So Hot" as a B-side. The song was later re-recorded for the Japanese release of their greatest hits album WonderBest (2012) and features the band's third line-up consisting of Min Sunye, Park Yeeun, Ahn Sohee, Kim Yubin and Woo Hyerim, with previous members' vocals removed. "Tell Me" was sung officially by Wonder Girls in 3 languages: Korean, English and Mandarin-Chinese.

Live performances 

This was the first single to feature Kim Yubin, the replacement for former member Kim Hyun-ah, who was removed from the group by her parents due to health issues. On September 5, 2007, Good Entertainment, the talent agency for the popular boy band Shinhwa, sent their trainee Yubin to JYP Entertainment as a replacement for Hyun-ah.  She made her debut three days later in the group's live performance of "Tell Me" on Music Bank. Due to the last-minute addition of Kim Yubin, the album version does not feature her; Before Hyuna left the group, according to sources she was already in the ‘Tell Me’ video. She was even the Wonder Girl in the music video but with her departure, Sohee took over the responsibilities. However, the version released and promoted by the group contained a rap verse performed by Kim Yubin. The single was a hit and reached number one on various Korean television and internet music charts, including KBS's Music Bank. Although the rap version was not initially given a release, it was eventually released as a B-side on the Wonder Girls' follow-up single "So Hot".

In popular culture 
The choreography for the song was simple and widely imitated: by October, many fan performances of the dance circulated on video sharing sites such as YouTube and Daum, including one by a group of policemen who were eventually profiled on SBS's Star King and performed both in front of and with Wonder Girls. This was dubbed the "Tell Me Syndrome" and led the girls to be named "Korea's Little Sisters". Many celebrities, including Shin Hye Sung, Super Junior's Kim Heechul, Nam Hyun Joon and Hong Kyung-min, also sang and danced to the song at their own fan meetings.  The song was labelled a "pop phenomenon" by the San Francisco Chronicle, and YouTube co-founder Steve Chen stated that the dance clips were among his favorites on the website. Furthermore, on the December 28, 2007 edition of Music Bank, Big Bang joined Wonder Girls for a performance that included both "Tell Me" and "Lies".

The song has also been covered by other K-pop artists, including in full by Girls' Generation on the July 4, 2008 edition of Music Bank. This was one half of a song trade where both groups covered one song by the other group, with Wonder Girls also covering "Kissing You" on the same show. Sistar also performed a dance cover of the song on MBC's Star Dance Battle on February 3, 2011. On May 25, 2016, JYP labelmates Twice covered the song at an open concert. In 2022, NewJeans covered "Tell Me" at the SBS Gayo Daejeon.

Legacy 
Tamar Herman of Billboard called the song the most influential song in Wonder Girls' career, writing that it "went viral as YouTube was just beginning out and resulted in a dance craze in South Korea based around the single's easy-to-learn choreography". In 2014, Mnet included "Tell Me" in their list of "Legend 100 Songs", a list of some of the most influential songs in Korean music history. In the same year, Star News named the track one of the ten best digital hit songs in South Korea. In a survey involving 30 Korean music critics published by The Dong-a Ilbo in 2016, it was chosen as the second best female idol song by both the public and music experts in the past 20 years. 

In a ranking conducted by 35 Korean music critics and industry professionals curated by Melon and newspaper Seoul Shinmun in 2021, "Tell Me" was named the ninth best K-pop song of all time. Music critic Hwang Seon-yeop said that "If I were to pick the most important event in the chronicle of K-pop, I think I could say without hesitation that it was the 'butterfly effect caused by this song'". Hwang added the song symbols "the starting point of the so-called 'hook song' trend, which uses addictive repeating phrases and emphasizes the importance of 'choreography' in idol pop. [...] This is a work that defined the concept of K-pop and opened up its revival in earnest."

Accolades

Release history

References

External links

Wonder Girls songs
JYP Entertainment singles
2007 singles
Korean-language songs
2007 songs
Songs written by Park Jin-young